James Edward McKnight (born June 17, 1972) is a former American football wide receiver in the National Football League (NFL) for the Seattle Seahawks, Dallas Cowboys, Miami Dolphins and New York Giants. He played college football at Liberty University.

Early years
McKnight attended Apopka High School, where he lettered in football, basketball and track.

He accepted a football scholarship to play for Liberty University under former NFL head coach Sam Rutigliano. He was forced to sit out his freshman season, however, due to the NCAA's Proposition 48 regulation.

McKnight became a starter as a junior, registering 50 receptions for 711 yards and 5 touchdowns. As a senior, he had 39 receptions for 812 yards and 8 touchdowns.

He finished his college career with 144 receptions for 1,948 yards (17.1-yard average), 17 touchdowns and eight 100-yard games.

Professional career

Seattle Seahawks
McKnight was signed as an undrafted free agent by the Seattle Seahawks after the 1994 NFL Draft on April 29. He spent the first ten games of the season on the practice squad, before being promoted to the active roster on November 19. In 1995, he registered 14 special teams tackles. The next year, he was second on the team with 25 special teams tackles.

He slowly developed into a deep threat at wide receiver. In 1997, he suffered a sprained knee injury in the preseason finale against the Cincinnati Bengals and missed the first 4 games of the regular season. He started 6 games, while registering 34 receptions for 637 yards and 6 touchdowns. In the ninth week against the Oakland Raiders, he had 4 receptions for 100 yards and one touchdown, marking his first career 100-yard receiving game. In that contest, he teamed with Joey Galloway (7 receptions for 117 yards) to become the third pair of receivers in franchise history to top 100 yards in the same game.

In 1998, he was the team's third wide receiver, finishing with 21 receptions for 346 yards and 2 touchdowns. On June 24, 1999, he was traded to the Dallas Cowboys in exchange for a third round draft choice (#80-Darrell Jackson).

Dallas Cowboys
McKnight spent the 1999 season on the injured reserve list, after tearing the anterior cruciate ligament in his left knee during the Blue-White scrimmage on August 5.

In 2000, he became the team's leading receiver after Joey Galloway was lost for the season, registering 52 receptions for 926 yards and 2 touchdowns. He also had to adjust while playing with 3 different quarterbacks (Troy Aikman, Randall Cunningham and Anthony Wright).

Miami Dolphins
On March 16, 2001, he signed as a free agent with the Miami Dolphins, reuniting with offensive coordinator Chan Gailey, who was his head coach with the Dallas Cowboys. He started 15 games, tallying 55 receptions for 684 yards and 3 touchdowns.

In 2002, he was relegated to a reserve role after Oronde Gadsden passed him on the depth chart, finishing with 9 starts, 29 receptions for 528 yards and 2 touchdowns.

The next year, he was the team's third wide receiver and his production dropped to 23 receptions for 285 yards and 2 touchdowns. He was released on March 2, 2004.

New York Giants
On May 20, 2004, he was signed by the New York Giants. He was placed on the injured reserve list after being sidelined with a turf toe injury since early in training camp. He wasn't re-signed at the end of the season.

Personal life
McKnight worked as a financial services advisor. He currently coaches the Cypress Bay High School wide receivers and track.

References

1972 births
Living people
American football wide receivers
Dallas Cowboys players
Liberty Flames football players
Miami Dolphins players
New York Giants players
Seattle Seahawks players
High school football coaches in Florida
People from Apopka, Florida
Players of American football from Florida